In mathematics, graph theory is the study of graphs, which are mathematical structures used to model pairwise relations between objects. A graph in this context is made up of vertices (also called nodes or points) which are connected by edges (also called links or lines). A distinction is made between undirected graphs, where edges link two vertices symmetrically, and directed graphs, where edges link two vertices asymmetrically. Graphs are one of the principal objects of study in discrete mathematics.

Definitions 

Definitions in graph theory vary. The following are some of the more basic ways of defining graphs and related mathematical structures.

Graph 

In one restricted but very common sense of the term, a graph is an ordered pair  comprising:
 , a set of vertices (also called nodes or points);
 , a set of edges (also called links or lines), which are unordered pairs of vertices (that is, an edge is associated with two distinct vertices).

To avoid ambiguity, this type of object may be called precisely an undirected simple graph.

A vertex may exist in a graph and not belong to an edge. Multiple edges, not allowed under the definition above, are two or more edges that join the same two vertices.

In one more general sense of the term allowing multiple edges, a graph is an ordered triple  comprising:
 , a set of vertices (also called nodes or points);
 , a set of edges (also called links or lines);
 , an incidence function mapping every edge to an unordered pair of vertices (that is, an edge is associated with two distinct vertices).

To avoid ambiguity, this type of object may be called precisely an undirected multigraph.

A loop is an edge that joins a vertex to itself. So to allow loops the definitions must be expanded. To avoid ambiguity, these types of objects may be called undirected simple graph permitting loops and undirected multigraph permitting loops (sometimes also undirected pseudograph), respectively.

Moreover,  is often assumed to be non-empty, but  is allowed to be the empty set. The degree or valency of a vertex is the number of edges that are incident to it, where a loop is counted twice. The degree of a graph is the maximum of the degrees of its vertices.

Directed graph 

A directed graph or digraph is a graph in which edges have orientations.

In one restricted but very common sense of the term, a directed graph is an ordered pair  comprising:
 , a set of vertices (also called nodes or points);
 , a set of edges (also called directed edges, directed links, directed lines, arrows or arcs) which are ordered pairs of vertices (that is, an edge is associated with two distinct vertices).

To avoid ambiguity, this type of object may be called precisely a directed simple graph. In set theory and graph theory,  denotes the set of -tuples of elements of  that is, ordered sequences of  elements that are not necessarily distinct.

A vertex may exist in a graph and not belong to an edge. Multiple edges, not allowed under the definition above, are two or more edges with both the same tail and the same head.

In one more general sense of the term allowing multiple edges, a directed graph is an ordered triple  comprising:
 , a set of vertices (also called nodes or points);
 , a set of edges (also called directed edges, directed links, directed lines, arrows or arcs);
 , an incidence function mapping every edge to an ordered pair of vertices (that is, an edge is associated with two distinct vertices).

To avoid ambiguity, this type of object may be called precisely a directed multigraph.

A loop is an edge that joins a vertex to itself. So to allow loops the definitions must be expanded. To avoid ambiguity, these types of objects may be called precisely a directed simple graph permitting loops and a directed multigraph permitting loops (or a quiver) respectively.

Applications 

Graphs can be used to model many types of relations and processes in physical, biological, social and information systems. Many practical problems can be represented by graphs. Emphasizing their application to real-world systems, the term network is sometimes defined to mean a graph in which attributes (e.g. names) are associated with the vertices and edges, and the subject that expresses and understands real-world systems as a network is called network science.

Computer science 
Within computer science, cybernetics uses graphs to represent networks of communication, data organization, computational devices, the flow of computation, etc. For instance, the link structure of a website can be represented by a directed graph, in which the vertices represent web pages and directed edges represent links from one page to another. A similar approach can be taken to problems in social media, travel, biology, computer chip design, mapping the progression of neuro-degenerative diseases, and many other fields. The development of algorithms to handle graphs is therefore of major interest in computer science. The transformation of graphs is often formalized and represented by graph rewrite systems. Complementary to graph transformation systems focusing on rule-based in-memory manipulation of graphs are graph databases geared towards transaction-safe, persistent storing and querying of graph-structured data.

Linguistics 
Graph-theoretic methods, in various forms, have proven particularly useful in linguistics, since natural language often lends itself well to discrete structure. Traditionally, syntax and compositional semantics follow tree-based structures, whose expressive power lies in the principle of compositionality, modeled in a hierarchical graph. More contemporary approaches such as head-driven phrase structure grammar model the syntax of natural language using typed feature structures, which are directed acyclic graphs. 
Within lexical semantics, especially as applied to computers, modeling word meaning is easier when a given word is understood in terms of related words; semantic networks are therefore important in computational linguistics. Still, other methods in phonology (e.g. optimality theory, which uses lattice graphs) and morphology (e.g. finite-state morphology, using finite-state transducers) are common in the analysis of language as a graph. Indeed, the usefulness of this area of mathematics to linguistics has borne organizations such as TextGraphs, as well as various 'Net' projects, such as WordNet, VerbNet, and others.

Physics and chemistry 
Graph theory is also used to study molecules in chemistry and physics. In condensed matter physics, the three-dimensional structure of complicated simulated atomic structures can be studied quantitatively by gathering statistics on graph-theoretic properties related to the topology of the atoms. Also, "the Feynman graphs and rules of calculation summarize quantum field theory in a form in close contact with the experimental numbers one wants to understand." In chemistry a graph makes a natural model for a molecule, where vertices represent atoms and edges bonds. This approach is especially used in computer processing of molecular structures, ranging from chemical editors to database searching. In statistical physics, graphs can represent local connections between interacting parts of a system, as well as the dynamics of a physical process on such
systems. Similarly, in computational neuroscience graphs can be used to represent functional connections between brain areas that interact to give rise to various cognitive processes, where the vertices represent different areas of the brain and the edges represent the connections between those areas. Graph theory plays an important role in electrical modeling of electrical networks, here, weights are associated with resistance of the wire segments to obtain electrical properties of network structures. Graphs are also used to represent the micro-scale channels of porous media, in which the vertices represent the pores and the edges represent the smaller channels connecting the pores. Chemical graph theory uses the molecular graph as a means to model molecules.
Graphs and networks are excellent models to study and understand phase transitions and critical phenomena.
Removal of nodes or edges leads to a critical transition where the network breaks into small clusters which is studied as a phase transition. This breakdown is studied via percolation theory.

Social sciences 

Graph theory is also widely used in sociology as a way, for example, to measure actors' prestige or to explore rumor spreading, notably through the use of social network analysis software. Under the umbrella of social networks are many different types of graphs. Acquaintanceship and friendship graphs describe whether people know each other. Influence graphs model whether certain people can influence the behavior of others. Finally, collaboration graphs model whether two people work together in a particular way, such as acting in a movie together.

Biology 
Likewise, graph theory is useful in biology and conservation efforts where a vertex can represent regions where certain species exist (or inhabit) and the edges represent migration paths or movement between the regions. This information is important when looking at breeding patterns or tracking the spread of disease, parasites or how changes to the movement can affect other species.

Graphs are also commonly used in molecular biology and genomics to model and analyse datasets with complex relationships. For example, graph-based methods are often used to 'cluster' cells together into cell-types in single-cell transcriptome analysis. Another use is to model genes or proteins in a pathway and study the relationships between them, such as metabolic pathways and gene regulatory networks. Evolutionary trees, ecological networks, and hierarchical clustering of gene expression patterns are also represented as graph structures. 

Graph theory is also used in connectomics; nervous systems can be seen as a graph, where the nodes are neurons and the edges are the connections between them.

Mathematics 
In mathematics, graphs are useful in geometry and certain parts of topology such as knot theory. Algebraic graph theory has close links with group theory. Algebraic graph theory has been applied to many areas including dynamic systems and complexity.

Other topics 
A graph structure can be extended by assigning a weight to each edge of the graph. Graphs with weights, or weighted graphs, are used to represent structures in which pairwise connections have some numerical values. For example, if a graph represents a road network, the weights could represent the length of each road. There may be several weights associated with each edge, including distance (as in the previous example), travel time, or monetary cost. Such weighted graphs are commonly used to program GPS's, and travel-planning search engines that compare flight times and costs.

History 

The paper written by Leonhard Euler on the Seven Bridges of Königsberg and published in 1736 is regarded as the first paper in the history of graph theory. This paper, as well as the one written by Vandermonde on the knight problem, carried on with the analysis situs initiated by Leibniz. Euler's formula relating the number of edges, vertices, and faces of a convex polyhedron was studied and generalized by Cauchy and L'Huilier, and represents the beginning of the branch of mathematics known as topology.

More than one century after Euler's paper on the bridges of Königsberg and while Listing was introducing the concept of topology, Cayley was led by an interest in particular analytical forms arising from differential calculus to study a particular class of graphs, the trees. This study had many implications for theoretical chemistry. The techniques he used mainly concern the enumeration of graphs with particular properties. Enumerative graph theory then arose from the results of Cayley and the fundamental results published by Pólya between 1935 and 1937. These were generalized by De Bruijn in 1959. Cayley linked his results on trees with contemporary studies of chemical composition. The fusion of ideas from mathematics with those from chemistry began what has become part of the standard terminology of graph theory.

In particular, the term "graph" was introduced by Sylvester in a paper published in 1878 in Nature, where he draws an analogy between "quantic invariants" and "co-variants" of algebra and molecular diagrams:
"[…] Every invariant and co-variant thus becomes expressible by a graph precisely identical with a Kekuléan diagram or chemicograph. […] I give a rule for the geometrical multiplication of graphs, i.e. for constructing a graph to the product of in- or co-variants whose separate graphs are given. […]" (italics as in the original).

The first textbook on graph theory was written by Dénes Kőnig, and published in 1936. Another book by Frank Harary, published in 1969, was "considered the world over to be the definitive textbook on the subject", and enabled mathematicians, chemists, electrical engineers and social scientists to talk to each other. Harary donated all of the royalties to fund the Pólya Prize.

One of the most famous and stimulating problems in graph theory is the four color problem: "Is it true that any map drawn in the plane may have its regions colored with four colors, in such a way that any two regions having a common border have different colors?" This problem was first posed by Francis Guthrie in 1852 and its first written record is in a letter of De Morgan addressed to Hamilton the same year. Many incorrect proofs have been proposed, including those by Cayley, Kempe, and others. The study and the generalization of this problem by Tait, Heawood, Ramsey and Hadwiger led to the study of the colorings of the graphs embedded on surfaces with arbitrary genus. Tait's reformulation generated a new class of problems, the factorization problems, particularly studied by Petersen and Kőnig. The works of Ramsey on colorations and more specially the results obtained by Turán in 1941 was at the origin of another branch of graph theory, extremal graph theory.

The four color problem remained unsolved for more than a century. In 1969 Heinrich Heesch published a method for solving the problem using computers. A computer-aided proof produced in 1976 by Kenneth Appel and Wolfgang Haken makes fundamental use of the notion of "discharging" developed by Heesch. The proof involved checking the properties of 1,936 configurations by computer, and was not fully accepted at the time due to its complexity. A simpler proof considering only 633 configurations was given twenty years later by Robertson, Seymour, Sanders and Thomas.

The autonomous development of topology from 1860 and 1930 fertilized graph theory back through the works of Jordan, Kuratowski and Whitney. Another important factor of common development of graph theory and topology came from the use of the techniques of modern algebra. The first example of such a use comes from the work of the physicist Gustav Kirchhoff, who published in 1845 his Kirchhoff's circuit laws for calculating the voltage and current in electric circuits.

The introduction of probabilistic methods in graph theory, especially in the study of Erdős and Rényi of the asymptotic probability of graph connectivity, gave rise to yet another branch, known as random graph theory, which has been a fruitful source of graph-theoretic results.

Representation 
A graph is an abstraction of relationships that emerge in nature; hence, it cannot be coupled to a certain representation. The way it is represented depends on the degree of convenience such representation provides for a certain application. The most common representations are the visual, in which, usually, vertices are drawn and connected by edges, and the tabular, in which rows of a table provide information about the relationships between the vertices within the graph.

Visual: Graph drawing 

Graphs are usually represented visually by drawing a point or circle for every vertex, and drawing a line between two vertices if they are connected by an edge. If the graph is directed, the direction is indicated by drawing an arrow. If the graph is weighted, the weight is added on the arrow.

A graph drawing should not be confused with the graph itself (the abstract, non-visual structure) as there are several ways to structure the graph drawing. All that matters is which vertices are connected to which others by how many edges and not the exact layout. In practice, it is often difficult to decide if two drawings represent the same graph. Depending on the problem domain some layouts may be better suited and easier to understand than others.

The pioneering work of W. T. Tutte was very influential on the subject of graph drawing. Among other achievements, he introduced the use of linear algebraic methods to obtain graph drawings.

Graph drawing also can be said to encompass problems that deal with the crossing number and its various generalizations. The crossing number of a graph is the minimum number of intersections between edges that a drawing of the graph in the plane must contain. For a planar graph, the crossing number is zero by definition. Drawings on surfaces other than the plane are also studied.

There are other techniques to visualize a graph away from vertices and edges, including circle packings, intersection graph, and other visualizations of the adjacency matrix.

Tabular: Graph data structures 

The tabular representation lends itself well to computational applications. There are different ways to store graphs in a computer system. The data structure used depends on both the graph structure and the algorithm used for manipulating the graph. Theoretically one can distinguish between list and matrix structures but in concrete applications the best structure is often a combination of both. List structures are often preferred for sparse graphs as they have smaller memory requirements. Matrix structures on the other hand provide faster access for some applications but can consume huge amounts of memory. Implementations of sparse matrix structures that are efficient on modern parallel computer architectures are an object of current investigation.

List structures include the edge list, an array of pairs of vertices, and the adjacency list, which separately lists the neighbors of each vertex: Much like the edge list, each vertex has a list of which vertices it is adjacent to.

Matrix structures include the incidence matrix, a matrix of 0's and 1's whose rows represent vertices and whose columns represent edges, and the adjacency matrix, in which both the rows and columns are indexed by vertices. In both cases a 1 indicates two adjacent objects and a 0 indicates two non-adjacent objects. The degree matrix indicates the degree of vertices. The Laplacian matrix is a modified form of the adjacency matrix that incorporates information about the degrees of the vertices, and is useful in some calculations such as Kirchhoff's theorem on the number of spanning trees of a graph.
The distance matrix, like the adjacency matrix, has both its rows and columns indexed by vertices, but rather than containing a 0 or a 1 in each cell it contains the length of a shortest path between two vertices.

Problems

Enumeration 
There is a large literature on graphical enumeration: the problem of counting graphs meeting specified conditions. Some of this work is found in Harary and Palmer (1973).

Subgraphs, induced subgraphs, and minors 
A common problem, called the subgraph isomorphism problem, is finding a fixed graph as a subgraph in a given graph. One reason to be interested in such a question is that many graph properties are hereditary for subgraphs, which means that a graph has the property if and only if all subgraphs have it too.
Unfortunately, finding maximal subgraphs of a certain kind is often an NP-complete problem. For example:
 Finding the largest complete subgraph is called the clique problem (NP-complete).

One special case of subgraph isomorphism is the graph isomorphism problem. It asks whether two graphs are isomorphic. It is not known whether this problem is NP-complete, nor whether it can be solved in polynomial time.

A similar problem is finding induced subgraphs in a given graph. Again, some important graph properties are hereditary with respect to induced subgraphs, which means that a graph has a property if and only if all induced subgraphs also have it. Finding maximal induced subgraphs of a certain kind is also often NP-complete. For example:
 Finding the largest edgeless induced subgraph or independent set is called the independent set problem (NP-complete).

Still another such problem, the minor containment problem, is to find a fixed graph as a minor of a given graph. A minor or subcontraction of a graph is any graph obtained by taking a subgraph and contracting some (or no) edges. Many graph properties are hereditary for minors, which means that a graph has a property if and only if all minors have it too. For example, Wagner's Theorem states: 
 A graph is planar if it contains as a minor neither the complete bipartite graph K3,3 (see the Three-cottage problem) nor the complete graph K5.

A similar problem, the subdivision containment problem, is to find a fixed graph as a subdivision of a given graph. A subdivision or homeomorphism of a graph is any graph obtained by subdividing some (or no) edges. Subdivision containment is related to graph properties such as planarity. For example, Kuratowski's Theorem states:
 A graph is planar if it contains as a subdivision neither the complete bipartite graph K3,3 nor the complete graph K5.

Another problem in subdivision containment is the Kelmans–Seymour conjecture:
 Every 5-vertex-connected graph that is not planar contains a subdivision of the 5-vertex complete graph K5.
Another class of problems has to do with the extent to which various species and generalizations of graphs are determined by their point-deleted subgraphs. For example:
 The reconstruction conjecture

Graph coloring 

Many problems and theorems in graph theory have to do with various ways of coloring graphs. Typically, one is interested in coloring a graph so that no two adjacent vertices have the same color, or with other similar restrictions. One may also consider coloring edges (possibly so that no two coincident edges are the same color), or other variations. Among the famous results and conjectures concerning graph coloring are the following:
 Four-color theorem
 Strong perfect graph theorem
 Erdős–Faber–Lovász conjecture 
 Total coloring conjecture, also called Behzad's conjecture (unsolved)
 List coloring conjecture (unsolved)
 Hadwiger conjecture (graph theory) (unsolved)

Subsumption and unification 
Constraint modeling theories concern families of directed graphs related by a partial order. In these applications, graphs are ordered by specificity, meaning that more constrained graphs—which are more specific and thus contain a greater amount of information—are subsumed by those that are more general. Operations between graphs include evaluating the direction of a subsumption relationship between two graphs, if any, and computing graph unification. The unification of two argument graphs is defined as the most general graph (or the computation thereof) that is consistent with (i.e. contains all of the information in) the inputs, if such a graph exists; efficient unification algorithms are known.

For constraint frameworks which are strictly compositional, graph unification is the sufficient satisfiability and combination function. Well-known applications include automatic theorem proving and modeling the elaboration of linguistic structure.

Route problems 
 Hamiltonian path problem
 Minimum spanning tree
 Route inspection problem (also called the "Chinese postman problem")
 Seven bridges of Königsberg
 Shortest path problem
 Steiner tree
 Three-cottage problem
 Traveling salesman problem (NP-hard)

Network flow 
There are numerous problems arising especially from applications that have to do with various notions of flows in networks, for example:
 Max flow min cut theorem

Visibility problems 
 Museum guard problem

Covering problems 
Covering problems in graphs may refer to various  set cover problems on subsets of vertices/subgraphs.
 Dominating set problem is the special case of set cover problem where sets are the closed neighborhoods.
 Vertex cover problem is the special case of set cover problem where sets to cover are every edges.
 The original set cover problem, also called hitting set, can be described as a vertex cover in a hypergraph.

Decomposition problems 
Decomposition, defined as partitioning the edge set of a graph (with as many vertices as necessary accompanying the edges of each part of the partition), has a wide variety of questions. Often, the problem is to decompose a graph into subgraphs isomorphic to a fixed graph; for instance, decomposing a complete graph into Hamiltonian cycles. Other problems specify a family of graphs into which a given graph should be decomposed, for instance, a family of cycles, or decomposing a complete graph Kn into  specified trees having, respectively, 1, 2, 3, ...,  edges.

Some specific decomposition problems that have been studied include:
 Arboricity, a decomposition into as few forests as possible
 Cycle double cover, a decomposition into a collection of cycles covering each edge exactly twice
 Edge coloring, a decomposition into as few matchings as possible
 Graph factorization, a decomposition of a regular graph into regular subgraphs of given degrees

Graph classes 
Many problems involve characterizing the members of various classes of graphs. Some examples of such questions are below:
 Enumerating the members of a class
 Characterizing a class in terms of forbidden substructures
 Ascertaining relationships among classes (e.g. does one property of graphs imply another)
 Finding efficient algorithms to decide membership in a class
 Finding representations for members of a class

See also 

 Gallery of named graphs
 Glossary of graph theory
 List of graph theory topics
 List of unsolved problems in graph theory
 Publications in graph theory

Related topics 
 Algebraic graph theory
 Citation graph
 Conceptual graph
 Data structure
 Disjoint-set data structure
 Dual-phase evolution
 Entitative graph
 Existential graph
 Graph algebra
 Graph automorphism
 Graph coloring
 Graph database
 Graph data structure
 Graph drawing
 Graph equation
 Graph rewriting
 Graph sandwich problem
 Graph property
 Intersection graph
 Knight's Tour
 Logical graph
 Loop
 Network theory
 Null graph
 Pebble motion problems
 Percolation theory
 Perfect graph
 Quantum graph
 Random regular graphs
 Semantic networks
 Spectral graph theory
 Strongly regular graphs
 Symmetric graphs
 Transitive reduction
 Tree data structure

Algorithms 
 Bellman–Ford algorithm
 Borůvka's algorithm
 Breadth-first search
 Depth-first search
 Dijkstra's algorithm
 Edmonds–Karp algorithm
 Floyd–Warshall algorithm
 Ford–Fulkerson algorithm
 Hopcroft–Karp algorithm
 Hungarian algorithm
 Kosaraju's algorithm
 Kruskal's algorithm
 Nearest neighbour algorithm
 Network simplex algorithm
 Planarity testing algorithms
 Prim's algorithm
 Push–relabel maximum flow algorithm
 Tarjan's strongly connected components algorithm
 Topological sorting

Subareas 
 Algebraic graph theory
 Geometric graph theory
 Extremal graph theory
 Probabilistic graph theory
 Topological graph theory

Related areas of mathematics 
 Combinatorics
 Group theory
 Knot theory
 Ramsey theory

Generalizations 
 Hypergraph
 Abstract simplicial complex

Prominent graph theorists 
 Alon, Noga
 Berge, Claude
 Bollobás, Béla
 Bondy, Adrian John
 Brightwell, Graham
 Chudnovsky, Maria
 Chung, Fan
 Dirac, Gabriel Andrew
 Dijkstra, Edsger W.
 Erdős, Paul
 Euler, Leonhard
 Faudree, Ralph
 Fleischner, Herbert
 Golumbic, Martin
 Graham, Ronald
 Harary, Frank
 Heawood, Percy John
 Kotzig, Anton
 Kőnig, Dénes
 Lovász, László
 Murty, U. S. R.
 Nešetřil, Jaroslav
 Rényi, Alfréd
 Ringel, Gerhard
 Robertson, Neil
 Seymour, Paul
 Sudakov, Benny
 Szemerédi, Endre
 Thomas, Robin
 Thomassen, Carsten
 Turán, Pál
 Tutte, W. T.
 Whitney, Hassler

Notes

References 
 
  English edition, Wiley 1961; Methuen & Co, New York 1962; Russian, Moscow 1961; Spanish, Mexico 1962; Roumanian, Bucharest 1969; Chinese, Shanghai 1963; Second printing of the 1962 first English edition, Dover, New York 2001.

External links 

 
 Graph theory tutorial 
 A searchable database of small connected graphs
 
 Concise, annotated list of graph theory resources for researchers
 rocs — a graph theory IDE
 The Social Life of Routers — non-technical paper discussing graphs of people and computers
 Graph Theory Software — tools to teach and learn graph theory
 
 A list of graph algorithms with references and links to graph library implementations

Online textbooks 
 Phase Transitions in Combinatorial Optimization Problems, Section 3: Introduction to Graphs (2006) by Hartmann and Weigt
 Digraphs: Theory Algorithms and Applications 2007 by Jorgen Bang-Jensen and Gregory Gutin
 Graph Theory, by Reinhard Diestel